Chris Corsano is an American drummer, improviser, and composer.

Career 

Alongside his solo work, Corsano has performed on over one hundred records with artists including Evan Parker, Sunburned Hand of the Man, Six Organs of Admittance, Dredd Foole, Bill Orcutt, Kim Gordon, Björk (on the studio recording and world tour for Volta), Thurston Moore, Jim O'Rourke, Jandek, Matt Valentine, Nels Cline, Vibracathedral Orchestra, Cold Bleak Heat, Michael Flower, C. Spencer Yeh, Mette Rasmussen, John Edwards, Sylvie Courvoisier, Okkyung Lee, and Nate Wooley.

Corsano has performed with saxophonist Paul Flaherty for more than twenty years and on more than twenty records in a style they call "The Hated Music." He has also recorded several albums each with Rangda (trio with Sir Richard Bishop and Ben Chasny), Chikamorachi (duo with Darin Gray), and Vampire Belt (duo with Bill Nace).

Corsano received a Foundation for Contemporary Arts Grants to Artists award in 2017.

Discography

Solo

References

External links

Chris Corsano website

1975 births
Living people
20th-century American drummers
American male drummers
21st-century American drummers
20th-century American male musicians
21st-century American male musicians
NoBusiness Records artists